The Czechoslovakian Wolfdog is a wolf-dog breed that began as an experiment conducted in Czechoslovakia in 1955.

After initially breeding working line German Shepherds with Carpathian grey wolves, a plan was worked out to create a breed that would have the temperament, pack mentality, and trainability of the German Shepherd and the strength, physical build and stamina of the Carpathian wolf. The breed were originally used as Border patrol dogs but were later also used in search and rescue, Schutzhund sport, tracking, herding, agility, obedience, hunting, and drafting in Europe and the United States.

It was officially recognized as a national breed in Czechoslovakia in 1982, and was officially recognised as a breed by Fédération Cynologique Internationale (FCI) in 1989.

History 

In 1955, Karel Hartl began to consider crossing a Carpathian grey wolf with a German Shepherd as a scientific experiment in the military kennels in Czechoslovakia. A few years later, however, the idea was born to establish a new breed. The first hybrids of a female wolf named Brita and a male German Shepherd named Cézar were born on 26 May 1958 in Libějovice.

Puppies of the first generation resembled the wolf in appearance and behavior. Their upbringing was difficult; training was possible, but the results hardly matched the effort. In adulthood, they were again bred with German Shepherds, decreasing the proportion of wolf blood to 6.25% in the fourth generation. Most individuals of the third and fourth generations were able to attend a normal course and could be placed in service performance. Compared with dogs they had better navigational skills, night vision, hearing, and sense of smell. In tests of endurance, hybrids finished the entire 100 km route without being exhausted.

A lecture by Hartl, "Results of crossing wolves with dogs", brought major attention at the World Dog Show held in June 1965 in Brno and in Prague at the annual meeting of the Fédération Cynologique Internationale (FCI) and the International Cynologic Congress. In the following year, Ing. Hartl compiled a draft standard of a new dog breed. Mating of the wolf Brita with the German Shepherd Kurt then created the basis of a second line. A third line was made by joining the wolf Argo with the female German Shepherd Astra from the SNB. In 1977, a third-generation hybrid female named Xela of the border guards was covered by the wolf Sarika; he also mated with the female Orta of the border guards.

However, the breed-in-foundation repeatedly refused recognition, and in the 1970s, most breeding dogs were moved to the Slovak military kennels near Malacky, under the supervision of Vice commander Major František Rosík. In 1971–1981, litters were born only in Slovakia. In 1982, the Club of Czechoslovak Wolfdog Breeders (Klub chovatelů československého vlčáka) was founded in Brno, with authority over the entire territory of former Czechoslovakia.

In 1982, the breed was again presented for recognition by František Rosík through the Club of Czechoslovak Wolfdog Breeders (now divided into Czech and Slovak Breed Club), and this time, it was recognized by the Czechoslovak breeders' associations as a national breed. The last addition of wolf blood took place in 1983. The wolf Lejdy of Ohrada Zoo in Hluboká nad Vltavou gave birth to the last line of the new breed, the father of the puppies being the German Shepherd Bojar von Shottenhof. Since that time, breeding has been carried out only in closed populations and the developed breed referred to as Czechoslovak Wolfdogs.

In 1989, it became provisionally recognized as FCI standard no. 332, group 1, section 1. It won the title of "World Champion" at the World Dog Show in Brno in 1990. Ten years later, in 1999, the breed confirmed its viability and met all the criteria of the FCI, earning full recognition of the Czechoslovak Wolfdog breed.

In 2012, the breed numbered 168 adult females and 170 adult males officially registered in the Czech Republic. As of January 2014, the most puppies each year are registered in Italy (up to two hundred), in the Czech Republic (about 100), and in Slovakia (about 50). The breed is growing in popularity in the UK too, with a number of Czechoslovak Wolfdogs working in Search and Rescue, supported by a dedicated Breed Club.

DNA analysis 
In 2015, a DNA study of the breed compared to German Shepherds and Carpathian wolves found only two maternal mitochondrial DNA haplotypes and two paternal Y DNA haplotypes within the breed. Both mDNA haplotypes and one yDNA haplotype originated with German Shepherd Dogs and was the result of back-crossing. The other yDNA haplotype was unique to the breed. All four haplotypes were distinct from those of the parental populations. The results indicate limited introgression of lupine alleles (genetic expressions) within a higher proportion of the canine genome, which is consistent with the backcrossing used in the breed. In 2019, a genomic study found that the amount of grey wolf ancestry possessed by the Czechoslovak wolfdog is 11–12% and the Saarloos wolfdog 18–33%.

Appearance 
The body frame is rectangular, with the ratio of the height to length being 9:10 or less. The expression of the head must indicate the sex. Amber eyes set obliquely and short upright ears in a triangular shape are its characteristic features. The set of teeth is complete (42) and very strong; both scissors-shaped and pliers-shaped dentition are acceptable. The spine is straight, strong in movement, with a short loin. The chest is large and flat rather than barrel-shaped. The belly is strong and drawn in. The back is short and slightly sloped; the tail is high set, and when freely lowered reaches the tarsi. The forelimbs are straight and narrow-set, with the paws slightly turned out, with a long radius and metacarpus. The hind limbs are muscular, with a long calf and instep.

The coat colour is yellow-grey to silver-grey, with a light mask. The hair is straight, close, and very thick. The Czechoslovak Wolfdog is a typical tenacious canterer; its movement is light and harmonious, and its stride is long.

Temperament 

The Czechoslovak Wolfdog develops a very strong social relationship; not only with its owner, but with the whole family. It can easily learn to live with other domestic animals that belong to the family; however, difficulties can occur in encounters with strange animals. It is vital to subdue the Czechoslovak Wolfdog's passion for hunting when it is a puppy to avoid aggressive behavior towards smaller animals as an adult. The puppy should never be isolated in the kennel; it must be socialized and get used to different surroundings. Female Czechoslovak Wolfdogs tend to be more easily controllable, but both sexes often experience a stormy adolescence.

The Czechoslovak Wolfdog is very playful, temperamental, and learns easily. However, it does not train spontaneously; the behavior of the Czechoslovak Wolfdog is strictly purposeful: it is necessary to find motivation for training. The most frequent cause of failure is usually that the dog is tired with long useless repetitions of the same exercise, which results in the loss of motivation. These dogs have admirable senses and are very good at following trails. They are very independent and can cooperate in the pack with a special purposefulness. If required, they can easily shift their activity to the night hours. Sometimes problems can occur during their training when barking is required. Czechoslovak Wolfdogs have a much wider range of means of expressing themselves and barking is unnatural for them; they try to communicate with their masters in other ways (mainly through body language, but also with quiet noises such as growls, grunts and whining). Generally, teaching the Czechoslovak Wolfdog stable and reliable performance takes a bit longer than teaching traditional specialized breeds. The Czechoslovak Wolfdog has been successfully employed as a Search And Rescue (SAR) dog in Italy, although handling one requires much more work than other breeds.

See also
 Dogs portal
 List of dog breeds
 Wolfdog
 Saarloos Wolfdog

References

External links 

 

FCI breeds
Dog breeds originating in the Czech Republic
Dog breeds originating in Slovakia
Rare dog breeds
Wolf-dog hybrids